The 2004 Penn State Nittany Lions football team represented the Pennsylvania State University in the 2004 NCAA Division I-A football season. The team's head coach was Joe Paterno. It played its home games at Beaver Stadium in University Park, Pennsylvania.

Preseason
The spring saw some changes to the coaching staff. Offensive coordinator Fran Ganter was named the new Associate Athletic Director for Football Administration, after 37 years as a player and coach for Penn State. Former Penn State quarterback Galen Hall joined the coaching staff as the new offensive coordinator and running backs coach. Mike McQueary, another former Penn State quarterback, joins the staff as the wide receivers coach and will also serve as the recruiting coordinator.

In addition to the coaching changes, head coach Joe Paterno had his contract extended through the 2008 football season, despite having had three losing seasons in the past four.

Last season's second-leading receiver Maurice Humphrey was expelled from school and convicted of three counts of simple assault. He would not play another down for Penn State. Humphrey's expulsion created a void of experience at the wide receiver position. Senior Gerald Smith was the most experienced receiver, and he had only 15 catches in 2003.

Prior to the season, Zack Mills and Derek Wake were elected team co-captains by their teammates.

Penn State started the season unranked in both the AP and the Coaches college football preseason polls.

Recruiting class

Schedule
Penn State did not play Big Ten teams Illinois and Michigan this year.

Personnel

Roster

Coaching staff
 Joe Paterno – Head Coach
 Dick Anderson – Offensive Line (Guards and Centers)
 Tom Bradley – Defensive Coordinator and Cornerbacks
 Galen Hall – Offensive Coordinator and Running Backs
 Larry Johnson, Sr. – Defensive Line
 Bill Kenney – Offensive Tackles and Tight Ends
 Mike McQueary – Wide Receivers and Recruiting Coordinator
 Brian Norwood – Safeties
 Jay Paterno – Quarterbacks
 Ron Vanderlinden – Linebackers
 John Thomas – Strength and Conditioning

Game summaries

Akron

The overwhelmed Zips find themselves behind 41–3 at halftime against Penn State, who subs in the backups, Penn State scores once in the third to make it 48–3, and Akron scores a late, meaningless touchdown against the Lions to bring the score to 48–10, with this being Galen Hall's first game as an offensive coordinator. This game gave Penn State fans false hope that their team was on the rebound from their 3–9 season last year. ESPN described the offense as "looking unstoppable", which led to the Lions being favored over Boston College the following week.

Boston College

Boston College takes a 14–0 halftime lead at home over the Nittany Lions, and then takes a 21–7 lead after three for the game's final points. Sloppy play on offense ultimately doomed Penn State as Boston College becomes the first of three teams to score 20 or more points on a defense that didn't allow more than 21 points all year and the only team to score 21 offensive points on the Nittany Lions.

UCF

Despite sloppy play and mistakes, the Golden Knights couldn't help but find themselves blown out by a much better Penn State team. After falling behind 3–0 in the first quarter, the Nittany Lions make it 21–6 at halftime and 30–6 after three thanks to a touchdown and a safety. The backups are subbed in for the fourth, both teams score, and it's 37–13 as the final score.

Wisconsin

In a defensive game, three of Penn State's quarterbacks were injured. Zack Mills was knocked out for the game, sustained a concussion, and backup Michael Robinson was taken away in an ambulance after sustaining life-threatening injuries from a vicious hit. Third stringer Chris Ganter did little against the Badgers' defense with Penn State only managing a field goal in the third quarter, barely preserving their streak of games without being shut out. Wisconsin only scored 16 points, which was well below their average for the year.

Minnesota

After the game, Minnesota players had said that they hadn't seen a defense of Penn State's caliber before, but won because of Penn State's offensive weaknesses, still, Penn State's defense kept them in the game for the majority of the game, which would be true for every game this season.

Purdue

Purdue managed only their second Big Ten win in history over Penn State by holding on for a 20–13 win at Beaver Stadium. It was a 10–10 tie and 17–13 after three, but Purdue's final field goal was enough to win it. Purdue's historic losses to Penn State include a loss in 2000 to a 5–7 Nittany Lions team while Purdue themselves were Big Ten champions, representing themselves at the Rose Bowl.

This game is also significant in the history of both Beaver Stadium and Penn State football for another reason not pertaining to the game itself. To try and draw extra excitement for the team, in what was a down year for the program, the athletic department asked the students to wear white to the game. Over 20,000 students participated in what would become the first ever White Out in school history.

Iowa

This is a game that by many Penn State fans was considered a low point for the football program because of the inept offenses and the fact that the only Penn State scores were defensive. The Penn State defense effectively shut down the Hawkeyes, forcing two first half field goals, but was unable to get anything going on offense. Penn State took a 2–0 lead on a safety early in the game, but the Hawkeyes had a field goal to make it 3–2, then another to make it 6–2 at halftime. The Hawkeyes barely gained any ground in the second half, and the Nittany Lions got their final two points from an elective safety in the fourth quarter because Iowa feared that Penn State would block the punt in the end zone, taking the lead on a touchdown, because they had already blocked a few punts that day. The strategy worked, Penn State coughed up the ball on their next drive and Iowa took a knee to kill the clock. While this game was a low point for Penn State, it was a big game for the Hawkeyes because head coach Kirk Ferentz's father died the week before.

While technically not an official White Out, students were encouraged to wear white again to this game. Participation was about the same as at the Purdue game and the loss resulted in a brief drop in the popularity of the event.

Ohio State

Ohio State scored a defensive and special teams touchdown, but Penn State's defense mostly kept them out of the end zone in a 21–10 loss, one of two times they scored double digits in the Horseshoe as a Big 10 team, the other time being in 2008 where they won 13–6 to take control of the Big Ten race. Penn State actually outscored the Buckeyes 10–7 offensively.

Northwestern

Penn State held the momentum and controlled the tempo of most of the game, but couldn't quite put the Wildcats away, despite having a few opportunities to, including a missed field goal and a drive that ended at the Northwestern 18, losing another close game 7–14.

Indiana

This is the game that is said to have turned Penn State's fortunes around. In the same way that the 1999 upset loss to Minnesota was believed to begin a downward spiral called "The Dark Years" by Penn State fans, this close game that ended with a four down goal line stand very late in the game, with Penn State clinging to a 22–16 lead, is said to have been the game that started Penn State on the winning track again and springboarded the team towards the 2005 Big Ten championship. Indiana managed a 13–7 halftime lead, but late in the game found themselves down 22–16, only scoring a field goal but leading 16–14 until Penn State took the lead on a late touchdown and two-point conversion. Penn State stopped Indiana four straight times at the goal line, eventually conceding a safety on the final play of the game to prevent Indiana from having a chance to win. Penn State's goal line stand at Indiana as a result of the momentum it gave the team is considered one of the best Penn State games.

Michigan State

The Spartans of Michigan State were 5–5, hoping to become bowl eligible, and the only thing standing in their way was a 3–7 Penn State team who only had one Big Ten win, but the goal line stand at Indiana that led to the Penn State victory the previous week gave them the momentum to win this game big. After a slow first half where Michigan State led 6–3, Penn State rolled off 28 third quarter points to put the game out of reach, going up 31–6 on the Spartans thanks to a plethora of interceptions. Penn State would kick two more field goals in the last quarter while the Spartans scored a late touchdown against backups.

Again, this game also sheds some light on the history of the White Out. After losses against Purdue and Iowa earlier in the season, the athletic department changed strategy with a "Code Blue" dress code. This time, it was extended to all fans in the stadium and students went from dorm to dorm to spread the word. Despite winning the game, the tradition did not stick and fans went back to wearing white the following season.

Awards

Watchlists

 Zack Mills
 Davey O'Brien Award watchlist
 Johnny Unitas Golden Arm Award watchlist
 Alan Zemaitis
 Jim Thorpe Award watchlist

Players

 Dan Connor
 First-team Sporting News Freshman All-American
 First-team FWAA Freshman All-American
 Andrew Guman
 First-team ESPN The Magazine CoSIDA Academic All-American
 ESPN The Magazine CoSIDA Academic All-District
 Tamba Hali
 Second-team All-Big Ten
 Paul Jefferson
 ESPN The Magazine CoSIDA Academic All-District
 Jeremy Kapinos
 Big Ten Special Teams Player of the Week (Oct. 30)
 Paul Posluszny
 Second-team All-Big Ten
 Big Ten Defensive Player of the Week (Nov. 13)
 ESPN The Magazine CoSIDA Academic All-District
 Alan Zemaitis
 Second-team All-Big Ten

Post season
The offense did not get going until the third quarter of the final game, but the defense finished the season in the top 10 in four NCAA statistical categories and was the only team in the nation to not allow more than 21 points a game. The Nittany Lion defense ranked fifth in scoring defense (15.3 points per game), ranked tenth in total defense (291.55 yards per game), ranked sixth in pass defense (162.3 ypg), ranked fourth in pass efficiency defense (99.8 rating), and held all 11 opponents below their total offense average.

Despite the losing record, Penn State ranked among the top four in attendance for the 14th consecutive year, averaging 103,111 in six home games, including attendances of 108,183 against Purdue and 108,062 against Iowa, the ninth and tenth largest crowds in Beaver Stadium history.

None of the departing players were drafted in the 2005 NFL Draft, but a number of players signed with NFL teams as free agents.

All-star games

References

Penn State
Penn State Nittany Lions football seasons
Penn State Nittany Lions football